Mujibur Rahman Dulu is a Bangladeshi film editor. He won Bangladesh National Film Award for Best Editing eight times for the films Bhat De (1984), Teen Kannya (1985), Satya Mithya (1989), Pita Mata Santan (1991), Banglar Bodhu (1993), Meghla Akash (2001), Itihas (2002) and Abujh Bou (2010).

Works
 Bhat De (1984)
 Teen Kannya (1985)
 Satya Mithya (1989)
 Pita Mata Santan (1991)
 Banglar Bodhu (1993)
 Meghla Akash (2001)
 Itihas (2002) 
 Ayna (2006)
 Abujh Bou (2010)

References

External links

Living people
Bangladeshi editors
Bangladeshi screenwriters
Best Editor National Film Award (Bangladesh) winners
Place of birth missing (living people)
Date of birth missing (living people)
Year of birth missing (living people)